Bamigboye is a surname. Notable people with the surname include:

Baz Bamigboye, British gossip columnist
David Bamigboye (1940–2018), Nigerian military commander and politician
Theophilus Bamigboye (born 1951), Nigerian Colonel